Opprobrium (formerly known as Incubus) is an American death metal band from Metairie, Louisiana, United States. The band was founded in 1986 by brothers Francis and Moyses Howard under the name Incubus. The Howards are natives of Rio de Janeiro who emigrated to New Orleans to found the band. The original incarnation featured bassist/lead vocalist Scot Latour, and the trio's 1987 demo Supernatural Death landed them a deal with the small Brutal Records imprint. Their official debut, Serpent Temptation, was released in 1988; however, LaTour departed soon afterwards, leaving Francis to take over vocal duties. Incubus signed with Nuclear Blast in 1990 and soon released their follow-up Beyond the Unknown; recording with Francis on bass as well, Incubus eventually tabbed Mark Lavenia as the full-time bassist. But shortly thereafter, in 1991, Incubus disbanded, then reappeared after a ten-year break from the music business, being forced to change their name in order to avoid confusion with newly emerging rock band Incubus from California. They released their album Discerning Forces on Nuclear Blast Records in 2000.

The band is noted for their particular style, a death/thrash metal crossover, combined with lyrics about death, violence and occasionally Christian references. Francis Howard and Scot Latour sang background vocals on the song "Stronger Than Hate", the third track on the Sepultura album Beneath the Remains. Francis Howard did guest session vocals on two Cannibal Corpse songs on the album Eaten Back to Life. The band is currently signed to Metal Mind Productions. On July 21, 2009, the band announced that the original bassist, Scot W. Latour, had re-joined the band, after 20 years. In 2017, there was some controversy around the band; it was thought that Metallica stole riffs from the band, when they were Incubus. It was later discovered that this was not true, but this brought attention to the band. The band did not agree with the claims of plagiarism; only the record label released a statement about these claims.

Members
 Current members
 Francis M. Howard - Guitar, Vocals (1986–present) Bass (1989-1990, 2000-2009, 2011–present)
 Moyses M. Howard - Drums (1986–present)

 Past members
 Scott W. Latour - Bass, Vocals (1986-1989, 2009-2011)
 Mark Lavenia - Bass, Vocals (1990-1992)
 Pete Slate - Guitar (1991)
 Luiz Carlos - Guitar (1997-2000)
 André Luiz - Bass (1992-2000)

Timeline

Discography
Serpent Temptation (Brutal Records, 1988)
Beyond the Unknown (Nuclear Blast, 1990)
Discerning Forces (Nuclear Blast, 2000)
Mandatory Evac (Metal Mind Productions, 2008)
The Fallen Entities (High Roller Records, 2019)

References

External links
Opprobrium at MySpace
Opprobrium at Discogs
Incubus at Discogs

1986 establishments in Louisiana
American Christian metal musical groups
American death metal musical groups
Heavy metal musical groups from Louisiana
Metal Mind Productions artists
Musical groups established in 1986
Musical groups from New Orleans
Nuclear Blast artists